Lukula is a town in, and a territory of Kongo Central province, Democratic Republic of the Congo. It lies on the road and disused Mayumbe railway line between Boma, to the south, and Tshela, to the north, on the southern bank of the Lakula river. Lukula lies at an altitude of 646 ft (196 m) above sea level.  
Economic activity includes cement production, utilising locally occurring limestone, and commercial Logging.

See also 

 Railway stations in Congo

References

External links 

Populated places in Kongo Central